Kelberg is a Verbandsgemeinde ("collective municipality") in the district Vulkaneifel, in Rhineland-Palatinate, Germany. The seat of the Verbandsgemeinde is in Kelberg.

The Verbandsgemeinde Kelberg consists of the following Ortsgemeinden ("local municipalities"):

Verbandsgemeinde in Rhineland-Palatinate